The Barbaros Boulevard is a -long major street in the Beşiktaş district on the European side of Istanbul, Turkey. It runs in a straight line in south–north direction from Beşiktaş Square over Yıldız up to Zincirlikuyu, where it passes over to Büyükdere Avenue. It is named after the Ottoman admiral of the fleet Hayreddin Barbarossa (c. 1478–1546), whose tomb is located in Beşiktaş.

It is a major artery of the Istanbul Central Business District, which is not located in the historic center of the city, but rather north of Taksim Square.

History
The construction of the boulevard began in 1957 within the urban redevelopment project for Istanbul by Italian city planner Luigi Piccinato initiated by Prime Minister Adnan Menderes (1899–1961). Opened to traffic in 1958, the street was called initially Yıldız Yokuşu (Yıldız Slope) or Yıldız Yolu (Yıldız Road) since it  passes through the Yıldız neighborhood. 

Its importance grew as it was connected to the 1973-built Bosphorus Bridge, which became the first direct route between the two sides on the Istanbul Strait. It serves as a feeder for the Bosphorus Bridge, which carries the inner-city motorway .

References

External links

Streets in Istanbul
Beşiktaş
Istanbul Central Business District